St Dominic's College, Henderson is an integrated college for girls in Year 7 to Year 13 located in Henderson, Auckland, New Zealand, 25 kilometres from downtown Auckland City.

The College was founded by the Dominican Sisters in 1952 in Northcote, Auckland. The school was transferred to Henderson in 1968. In 1982 the school was integrated into the State education system under the Private Schools Conditional Integration Act 1975.

History

The school was established by the Dominican Sisters, in order to serve the Catholic community of West Auckland, which had developed due to immigrants from Croatia (then Dalmatia), Ireland and Britain.

Notable alumnae

 Anne-Marie Brady (born 1966), Professor of Political Science, University of Canterbury
 Margaret Wilson (born 1947), academic and former politician

Notes

References and sources

 Mary Augustine McCarthy OP, Star in the south: the centennial history of the New Zealand Dominican Sisters, St Dominic's Priory, Dunedin, 1970. 
 St. Dominic’s College : silver jubilee, 1952-1977, The College, Auckland. 1977. 
 E.R. Simmons, A Brief History of the Catholic Church in New Zealand, Catholic Publication Centre, Auckland, 1978 and In Cruce Salus, A History of the Diocese of Auckland 1848 - 1980, Catholic Publication Centre, Auckland 1982.
 Michael King, God's farthest outpost : a history of Catholics in New Zealand, Viking, Auckland 1997.
 Nicholas Reid, James Michael Liston: A Life, Victoria University Press, Wellington, 2006.

Educational institutions established in 1952
Catholic secondary schools in Auckland
Dominican schools in New Zealand
Henderson-Massey Local Board Area
1952 establishments in New Zealand
Schools in West Auckland, New Zealand